Robert W.  "Bob" Murray (born 5 April 1942) is a former Australian rules footballer in the VFL.

Murray played with St Kilda initially as a forward, kicking four goals on debut, but soon moved to full-back. He starred in St Kilda's 1966 Grand Final win, taking a mark in defence with seconds left in the game. He won the Trevor Barker Award as St Kilda's best and fairest player in 1969.

Murray also played in the Victorian Football Association for the Sandringham Football Club. Prior to his time at St Kilda, he played 52 games for Sandringham, including (in the last game of that stint) Sandringham's 1962 premiership in which it came back from a 44-point three-quarter-time deficit to defeat Moorabbin by one point. After his time at St Kilda, he returned to play 2½ seasons with Sandringham from 1974 until 1976.

References

External links

1942 births
Living people
St Kilda Football Club players
St Kilda Football Club Premiership players
Sandringham Football Club players
All-Australians (1953–1988)
Trevor Barker Award winners
Australian rules footballers from Victoria (Australia)
One-time VFL/AFL Premiership players